Leech (James "Jimmy") is a fictional character appearing in American comic books published by Marvel Comics.

Leech made his first appearance in Uncanny X-Men as a Morlock, a group of mutants whose deformities force them to live in the sewers under Manhattan. He is usually depicted as being around twelve years old (his exact age is unrevealed). He speaks in broken English and refers to himself in the third person.

Publication history
Leech first appeared in The Uncanny X-Men #179 (March 1984), and was created by Chris Claremont and John Romita Jr.

Leech appeared as part of the "Morlocks" entry in The Official Handbook of the Marvel Universe Deluxe Edition #9.

Fictional character biography

The green-skinned Leech was orphaned as a toddler. His parents left him to die when his mutations became apparent. He was found by the Morlock Caliban and taken to a human-looking mutant woman named Annalee who raised him and several other young mutant orphans as her children. He made friends with X-Factor's ward named Artie Maddicks and had a few brief encounters with the X-Men.

During the Mutant Massacre story arc, Mister Sinister rallies his henchmen, the Marauders, to infiltrate the sewers and massacre all the Morlocks living there in an effort to rid the world of "genetically impure" mutants. While many Morlocks are killed, Leech and Caliban survive, rescued by Power Pack and the X-Terminators (X-Factor in their role of mutant hunters). Leech joins Artie in the care of X-Factor until they could be enrolled in St. Simons, a private school that willingly accepts mutant children.

Soon after they began attending this school, Leech and Artie are captured by mutant-hunting demons. Leech's technologically enhancing mutant friend, Taki Matsuya and an ad-hoc team of mutants, calling themselves the X-Terminators, join with the New Mutants in battling the demonic threat. They adventure through much of New York, witnessing much, such as innocent men being eaten, before the threat is contained.

Leech, Artie, and Taki return to St. Simons, though they do not stay out of trouble. Taki's crush on a teacher leads to uncovering a plot by mutant-hating humans to kidnap and kill as many mutants as possible. The young trio disobey orders and literally fly off. After much violence, the kidnapping plans are discovered and the conspirators arrested. A nearby resident, Ida Fassbender, discovers the trio's technologically assisted jaunts, and her paranoia endangers their lives. She resolves the problem and unofficially becomes the boys' grandmother. Leech is comforted by Ida's resemblance to Annalee.

Another kidnapping plan works successfully and Artie and Leech are taken by the murderous mutant terrorists Gene Nation.

This group was composed of second-generation Morlocks, the descendants of those who survived the massacre in the tunnels. They were born and raised in an alternate dimension with a faster flow of time than this one, called The Hill. They sought revenge for those who wronged their forebears. Gene Nation led a campaign to hunt down and kill as many humans as possible, since it was the humans' unwillingness to accept them that forced their parents into the tunnels in which they were massacred. Leech and Artie wanted no part of this, but were trapped until they were rescued by Generation X. They were thereafter made junior members.

Generation X

Leech and Artie continued to live in the Massachusetts Academy under the care of Emma Frost and Sean Cassidy. They are later joined by Franklin Richards, who stays at the school while suffering from the loss of his family. Their friendship has unexpected benefits, as Leech is able to control Franklin's powers when they, aggravated by his grief, go out of control.

The three visit the farm belonging to Hank McCoy's parents. Back at the Academy, they encounter Howard the Duck and other allies and as a group, are attacked by Black Tom Cassidy. Howard risks his life to save them all, then they are taken away by the Man-Thing. Leech and the rest have several adventures as the team called the Daydreamers. When Richards' family, who had previously been exiled to an alternate universe (see Heroes Reborn), return, the group was disbanded. Leech and Artie go back to the academy and take on more active roles.

Soon after, the school became bankrupt, and Emma and Sean were forced to open the school to human students. In order to keep Artie and Leech from being isolated, Emma gave them both an image inducer in the form of watches. The boys were quick to abuse this new technology, and were quickly set straight by Emma. Soon after, the school became exposed as a home for mutants, and Artie, Leech, and Penance were all sent away to protect them from any possible dangers that might arrive.

Weapon X

At some point, Leech is captured by the revived Weapon X program and was used by the Weapon X program to keep imprisoned mutants under control.  When the program was about to be discovered, those responsible attempted to erase all information surrounding it by killing the prisoners. Leech survives and is one of the estimated 198 mutants who retained their powers after M-Day and moves to an encampment in the Xavier Institute.

When an exploding supervillain causes the general public to turn on superheroes, Domino, Shatterstar, and Caliban break out the 198 and take them to a bunker in the middle of the desert. They are sealed inside with nuclear weapons that are activated for self-detonation, but they are eventually freed from the bunker. Leech accompanies Caliban down to the old Morlock tunnels where they are attacked by an extremist group of Morlocks led by Masque, who after knocking out Caliban, kidnaps Leech because he needs Leech's powers. He is then rescued by the X-Men and Skids.

Leech and Artie Maddicks were invited to Franklin Richards's birthday, and as a gift, Franklin invited them to live with the Fantastic Four. The two are now in a special class with intelligent moloids, Alex Power (Zero-G) of the Power Pack and other gifted kids. It is later revealed that Leech's cancelling powers were the reason that Reed Richards wanted him to be with Franklin. Leech later joins Reed's new Future Foundation superhero team.

Powers and abilities
Leech can dampen or completely suppress, neutralize, and negate for an undetermined amount of time the powers and abilities of any superpowered beings within 50 feet of him. His dampening ability in the beginning was involuntary and uncontrollable, but now his ability appears to be under his conscious control. Leech explained to Johnny Dee he could consciously bring his dampening field in close, so that persons are not dampened unless they touch him.

Leech has also been shown to dampen abilities that are non-mutant in origin at times, like the Fantastic Four, Hazmat of the Avengers Academy, and during Marvel's Mutant Massacre crossover event, Leech negated the powers of the superhero team Power Pack, whose abilities were bestowed on them by an extraterrestrial.

In X-Men: the Animated Series, Leech was shown to possess telekinesis when he stole fruits from a fruit stand and moved humans that were in his way when trying to escape.

When his ability has been targeted at mutants with super strength, at times his victims have become temporarily thin and frail.

Reception
 In 2014, Entertainment Weekly ranked Artie and Leech 23rd in their "Let's rank every X-Man ever" list.

Other versions

Age of Apocalypse
Leech is among the featured Morlocks that are survivors of Mister Sinister's experiments.

Ultimate Marvel
Leech was introduced to the Ultimate Marvel Universe in Ultimate X-Men #82 as a member of the Morlocks. He was never shown using his powers, so it is unclear as to whether or not they are the same. He looks similar, but more like an old man than a child. He was shot and killed by Sinister in issue #90.

In other media

Television
 Leech appears in a few episodes of the X-Men: The Animated Series, voiced by John Stocker. In addition to his power-dampening ability, he displays telekinesis. His most notable appearance was in the Christmas episode "Have Yourself a Morlock Little Christmas" where he needed a blood transfusion from Wolverine, temporarily granting him Wolverine's healing ability in order to fight off a disease.
 Leech appears in the X-Men: Evolution episode titled "Uprising" voiced by Danny McKinnon. In this series, his name was Dorian Leach, and he appeared fairly human with brown hair, only with pale, slightly greenish skin. His mutant ability releases an omni-directional pulse over an area at least the size of a city block. In addition to suppressing mutant abilities, it also nullifies all forms of energy, much like an electromagnetic pulse. The lasting effects are temporary, mostly fading after only one minute. In the episode, Leach's mother attempts to protect her son from being persecuted as a mutant, but is ultimately unsuccessful after a run-in with Spyke convinces him the boy is a mutant despite his mother's insistence otherwise. Following Leach's first use of his power to protect Spyke, Professor X approaches his mother with an offer for Leach to join his school when she feels that he is ready. He has a non-speaking role in the season finale, when Rogue absorbs his power/ability-neutralizing ability as part of a plan by Wolverine to beat Apocalypse. Her use of the ability in the fight demonstrates that it can be used to restore mutant abilities as well as negate them, as well as being able to direct the pulse as the ability's possessor sees fit.

Film

 Leech appears in X-Men: The Last Stand, played by Cameron Bright. Leech (named Jimmy in the film, and code named Leech on a file handed to Beast) is a child, however, unlike the comics, he speaks normal English and has no outward physical mutations, but he does have an absence of hair. His power automatically cancels the mutation of any mutant that comes within an area of only a few feet around him, even including reversing physical mutations such as Hank McCoy's blue fur: when Hank reaches out to shake Jimmy's hand, his own hand loses its furry blue appearance; the mutation returns once he pulls it away. Leech plays a pivotal role in the film as the source of a newly-created "cure" for the mutant X-Gene, the cure being a sort of retroviral gene therapy using Leech's DNA, that allegedly permanently cancels the mutation of any mutant. Magneto plans to kill Leech, who is being kept at the cure-producing facility, set up in Alcatraz, thus destroying the cure's source and effectively preserving the mutant species. Magneto and his newly expanded Brotherhood of Mutants attack the facility, which is defended by federal troops before they are joined by the X-Men. During the X-Men's fight against the Brotherhood, Juggernaut is sent in to kill Jimmy and Kitty Pryde races to save Jimmy from him. She reaches Leech before Juggernaut (who is also a mutant in the film), and defeats him by using Leech's nullification power against him, taunting him into charging right at them, and then moving them both out of his way as he comes close enough for his power to be canceled, causing him to knock himself out against a wall. Kitty and Jimmy then escape the building through the holes that Juggernaut smashed on his way in. Later, Jimmy is seen evacuating Alcatraz Island with the help of Pryde, and they receive further help from Bobby Drake. At the end of the film, Jimmy is seen as a member of the Xavier Institute with a full head of hair and is received by the new leader, Storm.  The effects of the cure were later proved to be temporary as the powers of Magneto and Rogue returned at a later point.

References

External links
 Leech at Marvel.com
 Cerebro's Files: Leech
 

Characters created by Chris Claremont
Comics characters introduced in 1984
Fictional illeists
Marvel Comics film characters
Marvel Comics male superheroes
Marvel Comics mutants
Marvel Comics orphans
X-Factor (comics)
Fictional characters with anti-magic or power negation abilities